Washington Township is one of twelve townships in Hendricks County, Indiana, United States. As of the 2010 census, its population was 44,764.

History
Washington Township was named for George Washington.

The John W. McClain House, A.A. Parsons Farmstead, and Smith Farm are listed on the National Register of Historic Places.

Geography
The streams of Abner Creek, Army Branch, Lake Forest Creek and March Creek run through this township.

Cities and towns
 Avon
 Plainfield (north edge)

Unincorporated towns
 Arborview Mobile Home Park
 Big Four Yard
 Six Points
 Wynbrooke
(This list is based on USGS data and may include former settlements.)

Adjacent townships
 Lincoln Township (north)
 Wayne Township, Marion County (east)
 Decatur Township, Marion County (southeast)
 Guilford Township (south)
 Liberty Township (southwest)
 Center Township (west)
 Middle Township (northwest)

Cemeteries
The township contains twelve cemeteries: Abner Creek, Barlow, Gossett, McClain, Merritt, Merritt Memorial Gardens, North Lawn, Salem Baptist, Shiloh Baptist, Shiloh Methodist, Smith and White Lick Presbyterian.

Major highways
  U.S. Route 36
  U.S. Route 40
  State Road 267

Airports and landing strips
 Speedway Airport (Closed)

Library
Washington Township is served by the Avon-Washington Township Public Library in Avon.

References
 U.S. Board on Geographic Names (GNIS)
 United States Census Bureau cartographic boundary files

External links

Townships in Hendricks County, Indiana
Townships in Indiana